Bearheart: The Heirship Chronicles is a 1990 novel by Gerald Vizenor; it is a revised version of his 1978 debut novel Darkness in Saint Louis Bearheart. The novel is a part of the Native American Renaissance and is considered one of the first Native American novels to introduce a trickster figure into a contemporary setting, even as he drew on trickster traditions from various Native American tribes, such as Nanabozho (Anishinaabe) and Kachina (Pueblo).

The novel follows the adventures of Proude Cedarfair as he leads a group of mixedbloods on a pilgrimage across a postapocalyptic, postindustrial United States that has run out of gas. This novel demonstrates several of Vizenor's key concepts: his use of trickster figures; his use of mixedblood (or "crossblood") Indian characters in a non-tragic way; his version of magical realism—what he calls "mythic verism"; and his conception of "postindian" identity; and his use of parody, as in the way the novel parodies both Chaucer's The Canterbury Tales and Frederick Jackson Turner's "Frontier Thesis".

References

1990 American novels
1978 American novels
Novels by Gerald Vizenor
Native American novels
Novels set in Minnesota
Novels set in New Mexico
1978 debut novels